Pentacitrotus tetrakore is a species of moth of the family Tortricidae. It is found in Taiwan.

The forewings are blackish purple with an obliquely oval white spot encircled by reddish-orange suffusion. The hindwings are fuscous purple, with an oblong-oval white subcostal spot.

References

Moths described in 1929
Ceracini